KBRF (1250 AM, "Good Neighbor Radio") is a radio station licensed to Fergus Falls, Minnesota, United States and serving the Fergus Falls-Detroit Lakes area. It broadcasts a news talk information format featuring programming from CNN Radio, Premiere Radio Networks and Westwood One.

The station is currently owned by Leighton Broadcasting, through licensee Leighton Radio Holdings, Inc. Studios and offices are west of downtown Fergus Falls at 728 Western Avenue North, near I94. The transmitter site is east of town, on Highway 210.

History

KBRF's first license was granted on October 20, 1926 as KGDE, licensed to the Jaren Drug Company in Barrett, Minnesota. The original call letters were randomly assigned from an alphabetic list of available call signs. The call letters were changed to KOTE in 1959, and became KBRF in 1967.

Expanded Band assignment

On March 17, 1997 the Federal Communications Commission (FCC) announced that eighty-eight stations had been given permission to move to newly available "Expanded Band" transmitting frequencies, ranging from 1610 to 1700 kHz, with KBRF authorized to move from 1250 to 1680 kHz. However, the station never procured the Construction Permit needed to implement the authorization, so the expanded band station was never built.

References

External links
KBRF website

FCC History Cards for KBRF (covering 1927-1980 as KGDE / KOTE / KBRF)

Radio stations in Minnesota
News and talk radio stations in the United States
Fergus Falls, Minnesota
Radio stations established in 1926
Otter Tail County, Minnesota
1926 establishments in Minnesota